GlobalWafers is a Taiwanese tech manufacturing company. They are the world's third largest silicon wafer supplier.

History 
In 2018 Nikkei Asia reported on extensive talent poaching issues from China being faced by GlobalWafers.

In 2020 GlobalWafers announced their attempted acquisition of German silicon wafer supplier Siltronic.

The deal to acquire Siltronic failed in 2022 when the German Government failed to clear the deal by the required deadline.

After their acquisition attempt to acquire Siltronic failed GlobalWafers announced that they would be putting the more than 3b USD earmarked for the acquisition towards capacity expansion.

In 2022 they were the world's third largest silicon wafer supplier.

Operations

South Korea
GlobalWafers operates in South Korea under subsidiary MEMC Korea Co. A second fab opened in 2019.

References 

Silicon wafer producers
Manufacturing companies based in Hsinchu